Hedges Peak, elevation , is a mountain peak in the Washburn Range in Yellowstone National Park, in the U.S. state of Wyoming. The peak was named in 1895 by geologist Arnold Hague to honor Cornelius Hedges (1837–1907), a member of the Washburn–Langford–Doane Expedition of 1871 and a prominent Montana lawyer.  Hedges' accounts of the expedition in the Helena Daily Herald newspaper contributed to the campaign to create Yellowstone National Park.  Prior to 1895 the peak had been named Surprise Peak by geologist J.P. Iddings in 1883.

See also
 Mountains and mountain ranges of Yellowstone National Park

Notes

Mountains of Wyoming
Mountains of Yellowstone National Park
Mountains of Park County, Wyoming